This is a list of all  PlayStation minis (PS minis) for the PlayStation Portable, which are games available to download from the PlayStation Store. Many of them are also compatible with the PlayStation 3 (PS3), as well as a few of them with PlayStation Vita (PS Vita) and PlayStation TV (PS TV) as indicated.

PlayStation minis

See also
 List of DSiWare games and applications

Notes

References

Minis
PlayStation Network games